A villain is an "evil" character in a story, whether a historical narrative or, especially, a work of fiction. In soap operas, the villain, sometimes called a "bad guy", is an antagonist, tending to have a negative effect on other characters. A female villain is sometimes called a villainess or "bad girl". Random House Unabridged Dictionary defines villain as "a cruelly malicious person who is involved in or devoted to wickedness or crime; scoundrel; or a character in a play, novel, or the like, who constitutes an important evil agency in the plot". An early use of the term soap opera villain was in 1942.

Tom Conroy from Media Life Magazine noted that "On soap operas, sometimes a perfectly nice regular character will suddenly turn into a villain. Viewers are rarely alerted to the change beforehand." Shelley Fralic of the Winnipeg Free Press described the "first-class villain" of soap as: "Ruthless magnate. Serial groom. Charming rogue. Unrepentant schemer. Demanding paterfamilias. Defier of death. Tough, impatient, decisive, magnetic and infuriating. The blackest of blackguards." A writer for Inside Soap magazine warned that "soap psychos" are often overly keen on their partners, keep them separated from their families, have strange things hidden in secret rooms, will attempt to kill their partner's ex-partner, and are fond of fire or high places and named a number of characters from EastEnders, Emmerdale and Coronation Street who have behaved in such ways. Debra Hale, writing about the fate of villains for the Associated Press, said that "Sometimes, a villain becomes so evil he's beyond redemption and must be killed or imprisoned", but noted that "some villains are just too delectable to kill." The following lists soap opera characters who have been described as villainous, evil, bad guys or baddies.

All My Children

 Les Baxter
 Vanessa Bennett
 Michael Cambias
 Adam Chandler Sr.
 Palmer Cortlandt
 Sean Cudahy
 Richard Fields
 Ray Gardner
 Rob Gardner
 Janet Green
 David Hayward
 Eric Kane
 Erica Kane
 Jonathan Lavery
 Greg Madden
 Greenlee Smythe
 Billy Clyde Tuggle
 Garrett Williams

Another Life
 Dan Myers
 Ron Washington

Another World

 Cecile DePoulignac
 Grant Harrison
 Donna Love
 Jake McKinnon
 Iris Wheeler

The Archers

 Brian Aldridge
 Sam Batton
 Matt Crawford
 Clive Horrobin
 Simon Pemberton
 Rob Titchener
 Wayne Tucson

As the World Turns

 John Dixon
 Lisa Grimaldi
 Craig Montgomery
 Barbara Ryan
 James Stenbeck
 Susan Stewart
 Carly Tenney
 Marshall Travers

The Bold and the Beautiful

 Sheila Carter
 Morgan DeWitt
 Quinn Fuller
 Jesse Graves
 Amber Moore
 Tawny Moore
 Deacon Sharpe
 Bill Spencer, Jr.
 Prince Omar Rashid

Brookside

 Dave Burns
 Josh Carter
 Imelda Clough
 Jimmy Corkhill
 Lindsey Corkhill
 Jeff Evans
 Callum Finnegan
 Terry Gibson
 Joey Godden
 Barry Grant
 Simon Howe
 Trevor Jordache
 Tommy McArdle
 Jack Michaelson
 Robbie Moffat
 Dan Morrisey
 Christy Murray
 Tim O'Leary
 Leanne Powell
 Emily Shadwick
 Sizzler
 Vinny

Casualty
 Scott Ellison
 Tina Mollet

Coronation Street

 Gary Adams
 Jude Appleton
 Lewis Archer
 Owen Armstrong
 Vinny Ashford
 Danny Baldwin
 Mike Baldwin
 Frank Bardsley
 Amy Barlow
 Ken Barlow
 Peter Barlow
 Simon Barlow
 Tracy Barlow
 Cilla Battersby-Brown
 Sharon Bentley
 Alan Bradley
 Jenny Bradley
 Corey Brent
 Stefan Brent
 Teresa Bryant
 Casey Carswell
 Joe Carter
 Lydia Chambers
 Mick Chaney
 Will Chatterton
 Kayla Clifton
 Neil Clifton
 Rich Collis
 Carla Connor
 Maria Connor
 Aiden Critchley
 Ray Crosby
 Nathan Curtis
 Ollie Deacon
 Jimmy Dockerson
 Joe Donnelli
 Rob Donovan
 Terry Duckworth
 Kieron Edgerton
 Hashim Elamin
 Fred Elliott
 Scott Emberton
 Carmel Finnan
 Frank Foster
 Harvey Gaskell
 Hannah Gilmore
 Tony Gordon
 Todd Grimshaw
 Caz Hammond
 Damon Hay 
 Jacob Hay
 Rachel Healy
 Clayton Hibbs
 Macca Hibbs
 Richard Hillman
 Kel Hinchley
 Dan Jones
 Greg Kelly
 Lauren
 Jon Lindsay
 Callum Logan
 Mel Maguire
 Anne Malone
 Marcia
 Becky McDonald
 Jim McDonald
 Karen McDonald
 Geoff Metcalfe
 Charles Moore
 Karl Munro
 Blake Myers
 Laura Neelan
 Rick Neelan
 Henry Newton
 Donna Parker
 Pat Phelan
 Grace Piper
 Rosemary Piper
 David Platt
 Kylie Platt
 Evelyn Plummer
 Tanya Pooley
 Jez Quigley
 Duncan Radfield
 Stephen Reid
 Griff Reynolds
 Jade Rowan
 Justin Rutherford
 Gina Seddon
 Maya Sharma
 Phil Simmonds
 Robbie Sloan
 Kirsty Soames
 Lillian Spencer
 John Stape
 Tony Stewart
 Julia Stone
 Charlie Stubbs
 Alex Swinton
 Linda Sykes
 Ryan Sykes
 Henry Thorne 
 Nick Tilsley
 Ronan Truman
 Josh Tucker
 Debbie Webster
 Rosie Webster
 Gary Windass

Crossroads
 Ethan Black
 Jake Booth
 Adam Chance
 Brian Noakes
 Angel Samson

Dallas
 J. R. Ewing

Days of Our Lives

 Lawrence Alamain
 Vivian Alamain
 Peter Blake
 Sami Brady
 Anjelica Deveraux
 Jack Deveraux
 Andre DiMera
 EJ DiMera
 Kristen DiMera
 Stefan DiMera
 Stefano DiMera
 Eve Donovan
 Theresa Donovan
 Nick Fallon
 Evan Frears
 Megan Hathaway
 Maxwell Jarvis
 Aiden Jennings
 Deimos Kiriakis
 Victor Kiriakis
 Xander Kiriakis
 Alex North
 Alex Marshall
 Orpheus
 Kate Roberts
 Jan Spears
 Leo Stark
 Ava Vitali
 Nicole Walker
 Ben Weston
 Clyde Weston

Desperate Housewives 

 Matthew Applewhite
 Carolyn Bigsby
 Edie Britt
 Jane Carlson
 Mona Clarke
 Rick Coletti
 Wayne Davis
 Alma Hodge
 Gloria Hodge
 Orson Hodge
 Martha Huber
 Victor Lang
 Patrick Logan
 Eddie Orlofsky
 Alejandro Perez
 Kayla Scavo
 Felicia Tilman
 Chuck Vance
 Dave Williams
 George Williams
 Paul Young
 Zach Young
 Donny

Doctors

 Marina Bonnaire
 Charlie Bradfield
 Princess Buchanan
 Zara Carmichael
 Ian Carter
 Franc Christophe
 Cherry Clay
 Layla Darwish
 Rhiannon Davis
 Harry Fisher
 Ria Ford
 Daniel Granger
 Jack Harcourt
 Anthony Harker
 Gus Harper
 Alex Haverley
 Lesley Hammond
 Leo Jackson
 Sissy Juggins
 Harrison Kellor
 Ocean Kennedy
 Davey Lowe
 Kate McGuire
 Liam McGuire
 Debbie McQueen
 Andrei Mitkov
 Scott Nielson
 Susan Oakley
 Chloe Pearce
 Lauren Porter
 Steve Rawlings
 Gareth Regan
 Eddie Slade
 Liam Slade
 Tom
 Tyrrel
 Trevor Waterhouse

Dynasty
 Adam Carrington
 Alexis Colby
 Dominique Deveraux

E Street
 Mr Bad (Stephen Richardson)
 Sonny Bennett

EastEnders

 Ahmet
 Johnny Allen
 Ruby Allen
 Gray Atkins
 Simon Atmore
 Tom Bailey
 Keegan Baker
 Clare Bates
 Terry Bates
 Bobby Beale
 Cindy Beale
 Ian Beale
 Lucy Beale
 Steven Beale
 Bijan
 Oz Bolat
 Abi Branning
 Derek Branning
 Joey Branning
 Max Branning
 Fi Browning
 Hugo Browning
 Luke Browning
 Bruno
 Janine Butcher
 Lewis Butler
 Frankie Byrne
 Lee Carter
 Stan Carter
 Richard Cole
 Charlie Cotton
 Dotty Cotton
 Nick Cotton
 Stella Crawford
 Neil Crossley
 Jack Dalton
 Alexandra D'Costa
 Madison Drake
 Tom Eden
 Andy Flynn
 Sonia Fowler
 Rob Grayson
 Ravi Gulati
 Danny Hardcastle
 Mo Harris
 Jonno Highway
 Stuart Highway
 Claudette Hubbard
 Vincent Hubbard
 Andy Hunter
 Sam James
 Lucas Johnson
 Ray Kelly
 Yusef Khan
 Leo King
 Tony King
 Tariq Larousi
 Katy Lewis
 Donna Ludlow
 Joe Macer
 Tosh Mackintosh
 Aidan Maguire
 Syed Masood
 Midge
 Archie Mitchell
 Ben Mitchell
 Billy Mitchell
 Glenda Mitchell
 Grant Mitchell
 Phil Mitchell
 Ronnie Mitchell
 Roxy Mitchell
 Aaron Monroe
 Alfie Moon
 Michael Moon
 Trevor Morgan
 Ellie Nixon
 Mehmet Osman
 Hunter Owen
 Mel Owen
 Steve Owen
 George Palmer
 Nish Panesar
 Suki Panesar  
 Danny Pennant
 Fraser Philips
 Annie Pritchard
 Dennis Rickman
 Dennis Rickman Jnr
 Willy Roper
 Mandy Salter
 Lydia Simmonds
 Bev Slater
 Harry Slater
 Hayley Slater
 Sean Slater
 Babe Smith
 Nikki Spraggan
 Evie Steele
 Lorraine Stevens
 Dan Sullivan
 Gavin Sullivan
 DI Steve Thompson
 Michaela Turnbull
 Owen Turner
 Angie Watts
 Chrissie Watts
 Den Watts
 Adam White
 Carl White
 Nora White
 David Wicks
 Dean Wicks
 James Willmott-Brown
 May Wright
 Dan Zappieri

The Edge of Night
 Raven Alexander Whitney

Emmerdale

 Paul Ashdale
 DI Mark Bails
 Emma Barton
 Ross Barton
 Derek Benrose
 Mackenzie Boyd
 Leanna Cavanagh
 Al Chapman
 Graham Clark
 Connor
 Reg Dawson
 Dean
 Belle Dingle
 Cain Dingle
 Charity Dingle
 Debbie Dingle
 Eli Dingle
 Noah Dingle
 Shane Doyle
 Sandra Flaherty
 Adam Forsythe
 Graham Foster
 Max Garrick
 Liam Hammond
 Danny Harrington
 Pierce Harris
 Nick Henshall
 Cathy Hope
 Eddie Hope
 Billy Hopwood
 Jason
 Eve Jenson
 Meena Jutla
 Carl King
 Matthew King
 Nicola King
 Rosemary King
 Sadie King
 Tom King
 Rakesh Kotecha
 Robbie Lawson
 Gordon Livesy
 Declan Macey
 Megan Macey
 DI Mark Malone
 Syd McFarlane
 Simon McManus
 Alex Moore
 Harry Mowlam
 Ray Mullan
 Cameron Murray
 Gary North
 Lord Alex Oakwell
 Eric Pollard
 Lee Posner
 Russell Posner
 Hari Prasad
 Denis Rigg
 Tracy Shankley
 Jai Sharma
 Grayson Sinclair
 Amelia Spencer
 Daz Spencer
 Sally Spode
 Maya Stepney
 Jo Stiles
 Steph Stokes
 Andy Sugden
 Robert Sugden
 Andrea Tate
 Chris Tate
 Jamie Tate
 Joe Tate
 Kim Tate
 Zoe Tate
 Will Taylor
 Terry
 Arthur Thomas
 Gabby Thomas
 Tara Thornfield
 Alan Turner
 Terence Turner
 Derek Warner
 Chrissie White
 Lachlan White
 Lawrence White
 Kelly Windsor
 Scott Windsor
 DS Jason Wise
 Kerry Wyatt
 Nathan Wylde

Fair City
 Billy Meehan

Falcon Crest
 Angela Channing
 Joel McCarthy
 Erin Jones

Family Affairs

 Pete Callan
 Chrissy Costello
 Graham Harker
 Julie-Ann Jones
 Dave Matthews
 George Shackleford
 Mike Shaw
 Olly Taylor
 Claire Toomey

General Hospital

 Luis Alcazar
 Peter August
 Scott Baldwin
 Derek Barrington
 Helena Cassadine
 Mikkos Cassadine
 Ryan Chamberlain
 Lucy Coe
 Cesar Faison
 Jerry Jacks
 Ava Jerome
 Ric Lansing
 Liesl Obrecht
 Lisa Niles
 Tracy Quartermaine
 Faith Rosco
 Heather Webber
 Anthony Zacchara
 Claudia Zacchara

Guiding Light

 Annie Dutton
 Brent Lawrence
 Dinah Marler
 Susan Piper
 Bradley Raines
 Daniel St. John
 Carmen Santos
 Alan Spaulding
 Roger Thorpe
 Edmund Winslow

High Road
 Jim Hunter
 Davie Sneddon

Holby City
 Tom Campbell-Gore
 Cameron Dunn
 Vanessa Lytton
 Isaac Mayfield
 Jac Naylor
 Kelly Yorke

Hollyoaks

 Scott Anderson
 DS Gavin Armstrong
 Dermot Ashton
 Jonny Baxter
 Gaz Bennett
 Fraser Black
 Grace Black
 Nico Blake
 Patrick Blake
 Sienna Blake
 Silas Blissett
 Wendy Blissett
 Big Bob
 Brendan Brady
 Victor Brothers
 Doctor Browning
 Pete Buchanan
 Laura Burns
 Justin Burton
 Kim Butterfield
 Lindsey Butterfield
 Cameron Campbell
 Granny Campbell
 Joanne Cardsley
 Derek Clough
 Fergus Collins
 Mick Cornus
 Carl Costello
 Seth Costello
 Norma Crow
 Holly Cunningham
 Steph Cunningham
 Ashley Davidson
 Jake Dean
 Clare Devine
 Joel Dexter
 Glenn Donovan
 Liam Donovan
 Scott Drinkwell
 Milo Entwistle
 Eva Falco
 Celeste Faroe
 Toby Faroe
 Eric Foster
 Warren Fox
 Mark Gibbs
 Will Hackett
 Deena Hardman
 Maya Harkwell
 Lydia Hart
 Ste Hay
 Terry Hay
 Rob Hawthorne
 Joseph Holmes
 Andy Holt
 Danny Houston
 Edward Hutchinson
 Verity Hutchinson
 Theo Jones
 Sean Kennedy
 George Kiss
 Ryan Knight
 Dr. Ley
 Lisa Loveday
 Sami Maalik
 Stephen MacGregor
 Stephen Mackintosh
 Ray McCormick
 Breda McQueen
 John Paul McQueen
 Mercedes McQueen
 Toby Mills
 Maddie Morrison
 James Nightingale
 Mac Nightingale
 Marnie Nightingale
 Nathan Nightingale
 Finn O'Connor
 Sinead O'Connor
 Darren Osborne
 Sam Owen
 Kate Patrick
 Jordan Price
 Donna-Marie Quinn
 Niall Rafferty
 Alex Ramsdan
 Cormac Ranger
 Summer Ranger
 Dennis Richardson
 Lewis Richardson
 Freddie Roscoe
 Robbie Roscoe
 Trevor Royle
 Trudy Ryan
 Kyle Ryder
 Will Savage
 Ali Shahzad
 Laurie Shelby
 Timmy Simons
 Buster Smith
 Stuart Sumner
 Shane Sweeney
 Sean Tate
 Shane
 Michael St John Thomas
 Calvin Valentine
 Sonny Valentine
 Walker
 Felix Westwood
 Darcy Wilde
 Ethan Williams
 Cher Winters

Home and Away

 Jonah Abraham
 Hugo Austin
 Kieran Baldivis
 Andy Barrett
 Morag Bellingham
 Saul Bennett
 Danny Braxton
 Heath Braxton
 Kyle Braxton
 Joanne Brennan
 Jacob Cameron
 Dylan Carter
 Johnny Cooper
 Robbo Cruze
 Donna De Bono
 Boyd Easton
 Ebony Easton
 Hazel Easton
 Donald Fisher
 Courtney Freeman
 Tabitha Ford
 David Gardiner
 Elliot Gillen
 Penn Graham
 Grigg
 Trevor Gunson
 John Hall
 Hammer
 Lewis Hayes
 Corey Henderson
 Eve Jacobsen
 Aden Jefferies
 Mick Jennings
 Charlotte King
 Hunter King
 Peter King
 Sarah Lewis
 Ethan MacGuire
 Douglas Maynard
 Susie McAllister
 Jade Montgomery
 Matthew Montgomery
 Mumma Rose
 Natalie Nash
 Ross Nixon
 Dennis Novak
 Dean O'Mara
 Tug O'Neale
 Tommy O'Reilly
 John Palmer
 Trey Palmer
 Paul
 Kane Phillips
 Jake Pirovic
 Dimitri Poulos
 Trystan Powell
 Revhead
 Irene Roberts
 Angie Russell
 Josie Russell
 Adam Sharpe
 Jamie Sharpe
 Anne Sherman
 Simmo
 Al Simpson
 Tank Snelgrove
 Spike
 Roo Stewart
 Sully
 Sophie Taylor
 Colby Thorne
 Amanda Vale
 Kelli Vale
 Josh West
 Tex Wheeler
 Jack Wilson
 William Zannis

Knots Landing
 Jill Bennett
 Abby Cunningham
 Joshua Rush
 Greg Sumner
 Danny Waleska

Loving
 Garth Slater

Neighbours

 Mick Allsop
 Britney Barnes
 Gareth Bateman
 Olivia Bell
 David Bishop
 Scarlett Brady
 Rocco Cammeniti
 Kyle Canning
 Mary Casey
 Gus Cleary
 Garland Cole
 Tim Collins
 Chris Cousens
 Louis Curtain
 Dennis Dimato
 Glen Donnelly
 Mannix Foster
 Cassandra Freedman
 Fiona Hartman
 Reuben Hausman
 Jacka Hills
 Izzy Hoyland
 Forrest Jones
 Kane Jones
 Finn Kelly
 Michelle Kim
 Katya Kinski
 Rhys Lawson
 Melissa Lohan
 Len Mangel
 Nell Mangel
 Diana Marshall
 Michael Martin
 Krystal McCoy
 Stephen Montague
 Troy Miller
 Sue Parker
 Nick Petrides
 Ari Philcox
 Gemma Reeves
 Ted Regan
 Ivan Renshaw
 Elle Robinson
 Paul Robinson
 Robert Robinson
 Hamish Roche
 Heather Schilling
 Stephanie Scully
 Harry Sinclair
 Robbo Slade
 Corey Smythe-Jones
 Adrian Snyder
 Andrea Somers
 Charlotte Stone
 Nicolette Stone
 Dave Summers
 Guy Sykes
 Mason Turner
 Darcy Tyler
 Claudia Watkins
 Sindi Watts
 Nicola West
 Natasha Williams

One Life to Live

 Ursula Blackwell
 Ted Clayton
 Margaret Cochran
 Melinda Cramer
 Marco Dane
 R. J. Gannon
 Michael Grande
 Carlo Hesser
 Mitch Laurence
 Dorian Lord
 Victor Lord
 Jack Manning
 Todd Manning
 Alex Olanov
 Allison Perkins
 Spencer Truman
 Brad Vernon
 David Vickers

Pacific Drive
 Trey Devlin

Passions
 Norma Bates
 Vincent Clarkson
 Alistair Crane
 Beth Wallace

Prisoner
 Joan Ferguson

Red Rock
 Patricia Hennesy
 Brian McGonigle

The Restless Years
 Rita Merrick

Santa Barbara
 Gina Blake Lockridge
 Keith Timmons

Search for Tomorrow
 Estelle Kendall

Shortland Street

 Regan Ames
 Katherine Blake
 Mackenzie Choat
 Paul Churchill
 Aleesha Cook
 Layla Cornwall
 Carla Crozier
 Greg Feeney
 Annette Freeman
 Brooke Freeman
 Josh Gallagher
 Bree Hamilton
 Joey Henderson
 Oscar Henry
 Jack Hewitt
 Samara Hindmarsh
 Fergus Kearney
 Darryl Neilson
 Hayley O'Neill
 Ethan Pierce
 Dylan Reinhart
 Penny Rourke
 Ian Seymour
 Zac Smith
 Robyn Stokes
 Dominic Thompson

Sunset Beach
 Eddie Connors
 Annie Douglas Richards
 Gregory Richards

Texas
 Clipper Blake

The Young and the Restless

 Sheila Carter
 Matt Clark
 Gary Dawson
 Kevin Fisher
 Jill Abbott
 JT Hellstrom
 David Kimble
 Chloe Mitchell
 Adam Newman
 Victor Newman
 Gina Roma
 Phyllis Summers
 Ian Ward
 Patty Williams

References

Soap opera
Villains
Soap opera villains